The Eumerini is a tribe of hoverflies. The breeding habits of this group varies: larvae of the genera Merodon and Eumerus tunnel into plant bulbs while larvae of Psilota have been found in sap runs.

List of genera 
Alipumilio Shannon, 1927
Austrocheilosia Thompson, 2008
Azpeytia Walker, 1865
Eumerus Meigen, 1822
Megatrigon Johnson, 1898
Merodon Meigen, 1803
Nausigaster Shannon, 1921
Psilota Meigen, 1822

References 

 
Eristalinae
Brachycera tribes